Zarrar Shah is one of Lashkar-e-Taiba's primary liaisons to the ISI and its communications chief.

According to The New York Times, Shah is "a senior Lashkar commander" and "a central character" behind the plot of the November 2008 Mumbai attacks.  Fox News reported that Shah communicated with gunmen over the telephone and helped direct their activities as he watched the events unfold on television.

On 10 December 2008, Pakistan announced the arrest of Shah for his role in the Mumbai attacks.  On 31 December 2008, it was announced that Shah had confessed LeT's involvement as well as his own central role in the attack.  According to Pakistani officials, Shah's interrogation confirmed most of the details that had been obtained from the only captured gunman.

On 12 February 2009, Rehman Malik, adviser to the prime minister on the interior, stated that Shah was still in custody and that he allegedly wrote the emails claiming responsibility for the attacks.

Investigations of Shah's computer and email accounts revealed a list of 320 locations worldwide deemed as possible targets for terrorist attacks similar to the November 2008 strikes in Mumbai.  Only 20 of the targets were locations within India.  Analysts believed that the list was a statement of intent rather than a list of locations where LeT cells had been established and were ready to attack.

References

External links
 
 Web of Terror. PBS Frontline. WGBH (interactive journalism).

Pakistani Islamists
Lashkar-e-Taiba members
Year of birth missing (living people)
Living people
Participants in the 2008 Mumbai attacks
Fugitives wanted by India
Fugitives wanted on terrorism charges
Pakistani people imprisoned on charges of terrorism
Pakistani computer specialists